

1976

In the year 1976, the first year of the award, 9 individuals were awarded in recognition of their contribution:
 Kazi Nazrul Islam (Literature)
 Muhammad Qudrat-i-Khuda (Education)
 Jasimuddin (literature)
 Sufia Kamal (literature)
 Abdul Quadir (literature)
 Muhammed Mansooruddin (education)
 Tofazzal Hossain Manik Miah (journalism)
 Abul Kalam Shamsuddin (literature)
 Abdus Salam (Editor) (journalism)

1977

 Mohammad Nasiruddin (literature)
 Ustad Gul Mohammad Khan (music)
 Ibrahim Khan (education)
 Mahmuda Khatun Siddiqua (literature)
 Khondakar Abdul Hamid (journalism)
 Ayub Ali (education)
 Shamsur Rahman (literature)
 Zahir Raihan (drama)
 Rashid Choudhury (fine arts)
 Abdul Alim (music)
 Altaf Mahmud (music)
 Ferdausi Rahman (music)
 Farrukh Ahmad (literature)

1978

 Khan Mohammad Moinuddin (literature)
 Ahsan Habib (literature)
 Zulfikar Haidar (literature)
 Mahbubul Alam (literature)
 Natyaguru Nurul Momen (literature)
 Ava Alam (music)
 Safiuddin Ahmed (art)
 Serajuddin Hossain (journalism)
 Sayed Moazzem Hossain (art)

1979

 Azizur Rahman (literature)
 Benajir Ahmed (literature)
 Abdul Latif (music)
 Sheikh Luthfur Rahman (music)
 Abdul Wahab (journalism)
 Mohammad Modabber (journalism)
 Muhammad Enamul Haque (education)

References

Civil awards and decorations of Bangladesh
Recipients of the Ekushey Padak